Cerdorhinus is an extinct genus of gorgonopsian therapsids from the Permian of South Africa. The type species Cerdorhinus parvidens was named by South African paleontologist Robert Broom in 1936. A second species, Cerdorhinus rubidgei, was named in 1937. In 2007, a specimen of the latter was reassigned to the genus Cyonosaurus.

References

Gorgonopsia
Prehistoric therapsid genera
Permian synapsids of Africa
Fossil taxa described in 1936
Taxa named by Robert Broom